Eois nucula is a moth in the family Geometridae. It was described by Druce in 1892 and it is found in Panama.

The spelling "nucula and "necula" have both been used. The discrepancy is explained by Brehm et al.:

References

Moths described in 1892
Eois